Delyn is a constituency represented in the House of Commons of the UK Parliament since 2019 by Rob Roberts, who was elected as a Conservative, but currently sits as an Independent following sexual harassment allegations.

The Delyn Senedd constituency was created with the same boundaries in 1999 (as an Assembly constituency).

Constituency profile
The seat comprises the mostly industrial Deeside communities of Mostyn, Flint, Mold, Northop and Holywell. Residents are slightly less affluent than the UK average.

Boundaries

1983–1997: The Borough of Delyn, and the Borough of Rhuddlan wards of Meliden, Prestatyn Central, Prestatyn East, Prestatyn North, and Prestatyn South West.

1997–2010: The Borough of Delyn.

2010–present: The Flintshire electoral divisions of Argoed, Bagillt East, Bagillt West, Brynford, Caerwys, Cilcain, Ffynnongroyw, Flint Castle, Flint Coleshill, Flint Oakenholt, Flint Trelawney, Greenfield, Gronant, Gwernaffield, Gwernymynydd, Halkyn, Holywell Central, Holywell East, Holywell West, Leeswood, Mold Broncoed, Mold East, Mold South, Mold West, Mostyn, New Brighton, Northop, Northop Hall, Trelawnyd and Gwaenysgor, and Whitford.

History
The Delyn constituency was created in 1983 from the seats of Flintshire West and Flintshire East. It is normally inclined to elect Labour MPs, although the Conservatives won the seat in their 1983 and 1987 landslide elections, and regained it in 2019 when they won their biggest national majority since the 1980s. From 1983 to 1997, the constituency included Tory-leaning Prestatyn, which was then transferred to the Vale of Clwyd seat.

Members of Parliament

Elections

Elections in the 1980s

Elections in the 1990s

Elections in the 2000s

Elections in the 2010s

Of the 75 rejected ballots:
54 were either unmarked or it was uncertain who the vote was for.
20 voted for more than one candidate.
1 had writing or mark by which the voter could be identified.

Of the 69 rejected ballots:
48 were either unmarked or it was uncertain who the vote was for.
19 voted for more than one candidate.
2 had writing or mark by which the voter could be identified.

Of the 105 rejected ballots:
87 were either unmarked or it was uncertain who the vote was for.
18 voted for more than one candidate.

See also 
 Delyn (Senedd constituency)
 List of parliamentary constituencies in Clwyd
 List of parliamentary constituencies in Wales

References

External links 
Politics Resources (Election results from 1922 onwards)
Electoral Calculus (Election results from 1955 onwards)
2017 Election House Of Commons Library 2017 Election report
A Vision Of Britain Through Time (Constituency elector numbers)

Parliamentary constituencies in North Wales
Constituencies of the Parliament of the United Kingdom established in 1983